Thusitha may refer to

Thusitha Jayasundera, Sri Lankan actress
Thusitha Laknath, Sri Lankan actor
Thusitha Wijemanne, Sri Lankan politician

Sinhalese unisex given names